Philibert de Naillac was Grand Master of the Knights Hospitaller from 1396 until his death in Rhodes in 1421. Prior to his election he was Grand-Prior of Aquitaine.

Bibliography 
 Joseph Delaville Le Roulx, Les Hospitaliers à Rhodes jusqu'à la mort de Philibert de Naillac (1310-1421), Paris, Leroux, 1913.

External links

References

1421 deaths
Grand Masters of the Knights Hospitaller
Christians of the Battle of Nicopolis
15th-century French people
Year of birth missing